Jeffery Stuart Pettis is an American-born biologist and entomologist known for his extensive research on honeybee behavior. He is currently head of Apimondia. He was the research leader at the United States Department of Agriculture's Beltsville Bee Laboratory (BBL). His research has led to significant breakthroughs in understanding and managing CCD, a primary cause of North American bee population decline. He is also known for discovering with Dennis vanEngelsdorp, then at Pennsylvania State University, the ability of bees to detect pesticides and harmful fungi in collected pollen and subsequently quarantine the harmful substances from the rest of the hive. His research has also studied the synergistic effects of Imidacloprid on bees, an insecticide derived from nicotine which has been shown to contribute to CCD.

References

1955 births
Living people
American entomologists
Texas A&M University alumni
University of Georgia alumni
Beltsville Agricultural Research Center scientists